McQuarrie is a family name of Scottish origin. It is an Anglicisation of the Gaelic Mac Guaire, which was a patronymic form of the Gaelic personal name meaning "proud" or "noble".

People with the family name McQuarrie
Albert McQuarrie (1918–2016), British politician
Christopher McQuarrie (born 1968), American screenwriter and director
Ralph McQuarrie (1929–2012) American conceptual designer and futurist
Stuart McQuarrie (born 1963), Scottish actor
William Garland McQuarrie (1876–1943), Canadian lawyer and politician

Related names
Macquarie
MacQuarrie

See also
Clan MacQuarrie

Footnotes